The 2000 Atlanta Braves season marked the franchise's 35th season in Atlanta along with the 125th season in the National League and 130th overall. The Braves won their sixth consecutive division title, however, the 2000 season would mark the first time since 1990 that the Braves did not appear in the National League Championship Series in a non-strike season. The Braves failed to go to their sixth World Series in ten years. One of the highlights of the season was that the All-Star Game was held at Turner Field in Atlanta.

Offseason
December 22, 1999: Bret Boone was traded by the Atlanta Braves with Ryan Klesko and Jason Shiell to the San Diego Padres for Wally Joyner, Reggie Sanders, and Quilvio Veras.
 January 12, 2000: Howard Battle was purchased by the Hanshin Tigers (Japan Central) from the Atlanta Braves.
January 20, 2000: Trenidad Hubbard was signed as a free agent with the Atlanta Braves.
January 28, 2000: Bobby Bonilla was signed as a free agent with the Atlanta Braves.
February 22, 2000: Steve Avery was signed as a free agent with the Atlanta Braves.
 March 31, 2000: Randall Simon was released by the Atlanta Braves.

Regular season

Opening Day starters
 Quilvio Veras – 2B
 Reggie Sanders – LF
 Chipper Jones – 3B
 Brian Jordan – RF
 Andrés Galarraga – 1B
 Andruw Jones – CF
 Eddie Pérez – C
 Walt Weiss – SS 
 Greg Maddux – P

All-Star game
The 2000 Major League Baseball All-Star Game was played in Atlanta. It was the 71st midsummer classic featuring the American League (AL) and National League (NL). The game was played on July 11, 2000 at Turner Field.

Five members of the Braves were part of the All-Star Game. Andrés Galarraga and Chipper Jones started at first base and third base, respectively. Tom Glavine, Greg Maddux and Andruw Jones were part of the team as well.

The 2000 All-Star Game was one of the few occurrences in which the manager of the host team also managed the home team of the game, in this case, the National League (Bobby Cox had led the Braves to the World Series the previous year earning the right to manage the National League). The final score was 6-3 in favor of the American League.

Season standings

Record vs. opponents

Transactions
June 5, 2000: Kelly Johnson was drafted by the Atlanta Braves in the 1st round (38th pick) of the 2000 amateur draft. Player signed June 12, 2000.
 June 5, 2000: Tony Gwynn, Jr. was drafted by the Atlanta Braves in the 33rd round of the 2000 amateur draft, but did not sign.
July 29, 2000: Stan Belinda was signed as a free agent with the Atlanta Braves.
July 31, 2000: B. J. Surhoff was traded by the Baltimore Orioles with Gabe Molina to the Atlanta Braves for Trenidad Hubbard, Fernando Lunar, and Luis Rivera.
August 25, 2000: Rich Amaral was signed as a free agent with the Atlanta Braves.
September 12, 2000: Stan Belinda was released by the Atlanta Braves.

Roster

Player stats

Batting

Starters by position
Note: Pos = Position; G = Games played; AB = At bats; H = Hits; Avg. = Batting average; HR = Home runs; RBI = Runs batted in

Other batters
Note: G = Games played; AB = At bats; H = Hits; Avg. = Batting average; HR = Home runs; RBI = Runs batted in

Pitching

Starting pitchers
Note: G = Games pitched; IP = Innings pitched; W = Wins; L = Losses; ERA = Earned run average; SO = Strikeouts

Other pitchers
Note: G = Games pitched; IP = Innings pitched; W = Wins; L = Losses; ERA = Earned run average; SO = Strikeouts

Relief pitchers
Note: G = Games pitched; W = Wins; L = Losses; SV = Saves; ERA = Earned run average; SO = Strikeouts

National League Division Series

St. Louis Cardinals vs. Atlanta Braves
St. Louis wins series, 3-0. Jim Edmonds strong hitting carried St. Louis.

Award winners
 Andruw Jones, OF, Gold Glove Award
 Chipper Jones, 3B, Silver Slugger Award
 Greg Maddux, Pitcher of the Month, September
 Greg Maddux, P, Gold Glove

2000 Major League Baseball All-Star Game
 Andrés Galarraga, 1B, starter
 Chipper Jones, 3B, starter
 Tom Glavine, P, reserve
 Andruw Jones, OF, reserve
 Greg Maddux, P, reserve

Farm system

References

 2000 Atlanta Braves at Baseball Reference
 Atlanta Braves on Baseball Almanac

Atlanta Braves seasons
Atlanta Braves season
National League East champion seasons
Atlanta Braves